Alexander Bade (born 25 August 1970) is a German former professional footballer who played as a goalkeeper. Since his retirement from playing, he works as a goalkeeper coach.

Career 
Born in West Berlin, Bade began his career with Tennis Borussia Berlin where he had played as a youngster. In the 1988–89 season, he transferred to 1. FC Köln, where, from 1991, he was in the cadre of the first team. In the shadow of Bodo Illgner, however, he was unable to see much action and only made five appearances in four years. He transferred to KFC Uerdingen, where once again he found himself out of favour, achieving only five appearances in his first two years, once again in the shadow of a more established player, Bernd Dreher.

In the 1998–99 season, Bade moved to Hamburger SV where he once again played second fiddle to Hans-Jörg Butt. He moved back to Köln in 2000 where he saw slightly more action than previously.

In the 2003–04 season, when Stefan Wessels suffered from an injury, Bade was given his chance to shine, and in the following season, interest was gathered from several clubs for the keeper who was finally showing his worth. His contract with Köln ran until the end of the 2005–06 when Köln failed to remain in the Bundesliga and he was transferred to VfL Bochum. He left Bochum after one year, joining Paderborn.

In January 2008, Bade moved to Borussia Dortmund. In September 2008, he completed a move to Arminia Bielefeld.

Bade returned on 25 June 2009 to his former club 1. FC Köln, taking up a job as goalkeeper coach.

Honours
Borussia Dortmund
 DFB-Pokal runner-up: 2007–08

References

1970 births
Living people
German footballers
Association football goalkeepers
1. FC Köln players
1. FC Köln II players
Hamburger SV players
VfL Bochum players
SC Paderborn 07 players
KFC Uerdingen 05 players
Borussia Dortmund players
Arminia Bielefeld players
Bundesliga players
2. Bundesliga players
Footballers from Berlin
Ferencvárosi TC non-playing staff